Walter Marti (born April 1, 1910) is a Swiss boxer who competed in the 1936 Summer Olympics.

In 1936 he was eliminated in the second round of the heavyweight class after losing his fight to the upcoming bronze medalist Erling Nilsen.

External links
profile

1910 births
Year of death missing
Heavyweight boxers
Olympic boxers of Switzerland
Boxers at the 1936 Summer Olympics
Swiss male boxers